The Men of Zanzibar is a 1922 American silent mystery film directed by Rowland V. Lee and starring William Russell, Ruth Renick and Claude Payton. The American consul in Zanzibar is informed that a fugitive American has just reached the African coast, and becomes suspicious of a newly arrived man from Boston, Massachusetts.

Cast
 William Russell as Hugh Hemingway 
 Ruth Renick as Polly Adair 
 Claude Payton as George Sheyer 
 Harvey Clark as Wilbur Harris 
 Arthur Morrison as Arthur Fearing 
 Michael Dark as Sir George Firth 
 Lila Leslie as Lady Firth

References

Bibliography
 Solomon, Aubrey. The Fox Film Corporation, 1915-1935: A History and Filmography. McFarland, 2011.

External links

1922 films
1922 drama films
Silent American drama films
Films directed by Rowland V. Lee
American silent feature films
1920s English-language films
American black-and-white films
Fox Film films
1920s American films